Deh Chenar or Deh-e Chenar or Deh-i-Chenar may refer to:
 Deh Chenar, Chaharmahal and Bakhtiari
 Deh Chenar, Kerman
 Deh Chenar-e Dalvara, Chaharmahal and Bakhtiari Province
 Deh Chenar-e Olya, Chaharmahal and Bakhtiari Province
 Deh Chenar-e Sofla, Chaharmahal and Bakhtiari Province